Top Model India, season 1 was the first installment of Top Model India. The series premiered on Colors Infinity on 4 February 2018 at 8:00 pm IST (UTC+5:30). Sixteen finalists were chosen to compete for the show.

The winner of the competition was 21-year-old Mahir Pandhi from Delhi. As his prizes, he received a one-year modelling contract with Bling Entertainment Solution.

Cast

Contestants

Judges & Mentor 
 Lisa Haydon 
 Anaita Shroff Adajania 
 Atul Kasbekar 
 Shibani Dandekar

Episodes

Episode 1
Original airdate: 

 Special guest: Dhruv Kapoor

Episode 2
Original airdate: 

First call-out: Gurin Bal
Bottom two: Joshua Chhabra & Nupura Bhaskar
Eliminated: Nupura Bhaskar
Featured photographer: Atul Kasbekar
 Special guest: Ricky Chatterjee

Episode 3
Original airdate: 

First call-out: Joshua Chhabra
Bottom two: Lemuel Huffman & Marina Lang
Eliminated: Lemuel Huffman
Featured photographer: Amit Khanna
 Special guest: Daniel Bauer

Episode 4
Original airdate: 

First call-out: Joshua Chhabra
Bottom two: Marina Lang & Sidharth Neeraj Sharma
Eliminated: Marina Lang
Featured photographer: Toranj Kayvon
 Special guest: Nora Fatehi

Episode 5
Original airdate: 

Entered: Ram Ramasamy
First call-out: Mahir Pandhi
Bottom two: Pearl Almeida & Satabdi Dutta Banik
Eliminated: Pearl Almeida
Featured photographer: Varun Mehta
 Special guest: Anshuka Parwani

Episode 6
Original airdate: 

Immune: Gurin Bal
First call-out: Aishwarya Suresh
Bottom three: Joshua Chhabra, Ram Ramasamy & Sidharth Neeraj Sharma 
Eliminated: Ram Ramasamy & Sidharth Neeraj Sharma

Episode 7
Original airdate: 

First call-out: Shehzad Deol
Bottom two: Joshua Chhabra & Mahir Pandhi
Eliminated: None
Special guest: Miss Malini

Episode 8
Original airdate: 

First call-out: Joshua Chhabra
Bottom two: Gurin Bal & Rishitha Koruturu
Eliminated: Gurin Bal

Episode 9
Original airdate: 

First call-out: Mahir Pandhi
Bottom three: Aishwarya Suresh, Joshua Chhabra & Rishitha Koruturu
Eliminated: Joshua Chhabra & Rishitha Koruturu
 Special guest: Dino Morea

Episode 10
Original airdate: 

Final four: Aishwarya Suresh, Mahir Pandhi, Satabdi Dutta Banik & Shehzad Deol
Eliminated outside of judging panel: Satabdi Dutta Banik
Final three: Aishwarya Suresh, Mahir Pandhi & Shehzad Deol
Eliminated: Aishwarya Suresh
Final two: Mahir Pandhi & Shehzad Deol
Top Model India: Mahir Pandhi
Special guest: Manish Malhotra, Akash Sharma

Summaries

Results

 The contestant was eliminated
 The contestant was immune from elimination
 The contestant was in a non-elimination bottom two
 The contestant was eliminated outside of judging panel
 The contestant won the competition

Notes

Photo shoot guide
Episode 1 photo shoot: OPPO selfies (casting)
Episode 2 photo shoot: Tribal beauty shots with a Tarantula
Episode 3 photo shoot: Lingerie(By Amante) and Men's Innerwear - in Pairs
Episode 4 photo shoot: Renault Captur campaign; Black and White Photo shoot with Lisa Haydon in Anaita Shroff Adajania's Styling
Episode 5 photo shoot: Posing With a Horse in White Outfits
Episode 6 photo shoot: "Raw and Rugged"- Posing and Runway in Desert
Episode 7 photo shoot: 7 deadly sins - Location: Graveyard
Episode 8 photo shoot: "SuperHeroes"- Posing in a Vertical Runway with Silk Fabric
Episode 9 photo shoot: "Back Stage Life"- Wearing Ethnic Designs
Episode 10 fashion show: Fashion show for Manish Malhotra 

Top Model
2018 Indian television seasons